Strangers with Candy is a television series produced by Comedy Central.

Strangers with Candy may also refer to:

 Strangers with Candy, a five-piece nu metal music group
 Strangers with Candy (film), a 2005 American film